The Stracin–Kumanovo operation was an offensive operation conducted in 1944 by the Bulgarian Army against German forces in occupied Yugoslavia which culminated in the capture of Skopje in 1944. With the Bulgarian declaration of war on Germany on September 8, followed by Bulgarian withdrawal from the area, the German 1st Mountain Division moved north, occupied Skopje, and secured the strategic Belgrade–Nis–Salonika railroad line. On October 14, withdrawing from Greece, Army Group E faced Soviet and Bulgarian divisions advancing in Eastern Serbia and Vardar Macedonia; by November 2, the last German units left Northern Greece.

By early October, Bulgarian forces were breaking through into eastern Serbia, Vardar Macedonia and Kosovo in support of the Soviet advance towards Belgrade. Although the Bulgarian army drove the Germans out of Skopje and what is now North Macedonia, later the Yugoslav and today the Macedonian historiography has played down its role for ethnopolitical reasons. Accounts of these events in post-war Yugoslav literature give the impression that the Germans were driven out by the communist Partisans who liberated the area. There was some fighting by Yugoslav Partisans, but their actions were insignificant compared with Bulgarian military activity. The greeting of Bulgarian troops in Skopje as liberators at the end of the operation is still denied there. 

After had captured Skopje, on 14 November the Bulgarian Second Army and the Yugoslav Partisans kept driving the Albanian SS Division and Balli Kombëtar back, until Kosovo had been seized.

Development

Bulgarian military activity 
 

The operation, from October 8 to November 14, was conducted in parallel with three other Bulgarian offensives in Yugoslavia: the Niš operation, the Kosovo operation and the Bregalnitsa-Strumica operation. Bulgarians supported the Soviet offensive in the area, which was aided by Yugoslav, Albanian and Greek Partisans. It was conducted to close the road to retreat for Army Group E from Greece to central Europe. Bulgarian troops began the offensive on October 8, entering Kriva Palanka. They fought for the Stražin ridge on October 18 and seized Stracin on October 25 with support from the Bulgarian Air Force. The battle for Stražin against German air and ground forces was fierce, and it was captured after an attack by Bulgarian paratroopers. Thirty-five paratroopers were killed and 64 were injured, one-fourth of the Parachute Druzhina unit. Battles continued on the Pčinja River and in the city of Kumanovo (on 11 November), where portions of the Wehrmacht were pushed back. The Bulgarians developed the advance towards Skopje into a large-scale offensive, raising the possibility of cutting off Army Group E. The situation was desperate, and the town was evacuated finally during the night of November 13/14. On November 13 and 14, portions of the First and Fourth Bulgarian Armies entered Skopje. The onslaught continued as part of the Kosovo operation, and Bulgarian troops captured Pristina on November 19.

Capture of Skopje 
Parallel to the Soviet advance in Eastern Serbia, Bulgarian forces south and south-west of Niš threatened the last German troop-withdrawal route from Skopje. To avoid being cut off, the German command in Mitrovica deployed portions of the 22nd Air Landing Division in the city, while the 11th Luftwaffe Field Division shielded the operational area to the north at Pristina. A crisis arose during the fighting at Pristina in early November, when the 11th Luftwaffe Field Division gave way under Bulgarian attacks. The army group established a new blocking line, enabling the German position at Skopje to be held. The offensive of the Bulgarians, which attacked well-equipped with the support of tanks and fighter planes in the Skopje area, forced the Germans to evacuate their forces, which they carried out on schedule; their main forces abandoned Skopje on 11–12 November. The German rearguard abandoned Skopje early on 14 November. Skopje was seized with the decisive role of Bulgarian troops. On a series of Army Group E maps of its withdrawal through Vardar Macedonia and southern Serbia and in the memoirs of its chief of staff, there is almost no indication of Yugoslav Partisan units. According to Allied Commission British commissioner in Sofia General Walter Oxley, who visited the front line in Stracin, the task of the Bulgarian army was to advance west and cut the Skopje-Pristina-Kraljevo rail line. Oxley noted that the Bulgarians were given freedom of action, and no Soviet troops were in the area of its offensive. Oxley reported that a small number of Yugoslav partisans were in the area of the Bulgarian operations, but it was difficult for them to take serious action against the well-organised German units. Impressed by the discipline of the Bulgarian soldiers, he noted that it was a problem for the partisans. Oxley said that Skopje was seized after weak German resistance with Bulgarian Army attacks, and the partisans held back until the Bulgarians entered the city. According to an agreement between Bulgarian and Yugoslav authorities, the Bulgarian troops coordinated their entry into the city with the Yugoslav partisans. The Bulgarians retained their prisoners of war, but gave weapons abandoned by the Germans to Josip Broz Tito's partisans. Units of the Fourth Bulgarian Army entered Skopje early in the morning of 14 November, and the last nests of German resistance were cleared. According to a November 15 summary by the Army Group E intelligence staff chief, units of the 4th Bulgarian Army (the 5th Infantry Division) and the 1st Bulgarian Army (the 2nd Infantry Division) seized the city after the withdrawal of German troops. News that Skopje was captured by the Bulgarians was reported on November 14 and 15 by Radio Moscow, Radio London, the Voice of America, and Radio Sofia.

After the liberation of Skopje, the new Macedonian authorities confiscated лв.430 million, stamps, and other securities from the former Bulgarian National Bank building. They refused to give the funds to Sofia, and General Damyan Velchev ordered a Bulgarian artillery regiment to return from South Serbia to shell Skopje and confiscate the funds. The order was rescinded after the intervention of Marshal of the Soviet Union Fyodor Tolbukhin, preventing an armed conflict. Bulgarian currency had been used by the short-lived pro-German puppet government, and remained in use by the new Macedonian communist authorities.

Controversy

Descriptions of events 

In the autumn of 1944, the Bulgarian army was the primary force driving the Germans out of Vardar Macedonia. The Macedonian Partisans were not a significant military force; they were ill-equipped, lacked tanks, artillery and airplanes, and relied on guerrilla warfare. Before the Tito-Stalin split in 1948, 
General Mihajlo Apostolski wrote that it was tactically advantageous to include the reorganized Bulgarian army in the Macedonian war against the Germans. As a result of the Tito–Stalin split, however, Yugoslav and (later) Macedonian historiography has minimized Bulgaria's role. According to Macedonian sources, the Bulgarians did not participate in the capture of Skopje even as observers. According to Apostolski, Skopje was liberated by Yugoslav partisans after several days of heavy fighting. Partisan Jordan Cekov wrote that street battles to liberate western Skopje ended late in the evening of November 13, but continued in the city's eastern half. One Bulgarian unit had nearly reached the center of Skopje by about 3 am on November 14, but it was pushed back to the outskirts by Partisans and was not allowed to reenter the city until noon. According to Partisan Trajko Stamatoski, there were attempts by some Bulgarian units to claim credit for the liberation of Skopje but "we did not allow it then, or today". Boro Čuškar claimed that a parade by the Bulgarian troops was prevented and that they were not involved in the liberation of Skopje.

On the other hand, according to Macedonian Goce Delčev Brigade commander and first commandant of Skopje after its liberation, Petar Traykov, Apostolski said that he had liberated Skopje and did not allow Bulgarian troops to enter the city even, but this was not true. Goce Delčev Brigade member Metodi Karpachev said that his unit entered Skopje on the morning on November 14 to find it seized by Bulgarian troops. The population did not welcome the partisans with their expected enthusiasm, and Karpachev later joined the Bulgarian forces. Bulgarian sources say that the first unit, which entered Skopje on November 13 at 6:30 pm, was the cavalry intelligence platoon of the Second Infantry Division of the 4th Bulgarian Army after the main German force had left the city. The Second Infantry Division of the First Bulgarian Army took its southern and the eastern areas at 11 pm, and the Bulgarians seized the city center at midnight. Because the bridges and other approaches to Skopje had been destroyed by the Germans, only infantry and cavalry units entered the city first. Strategic parts of the city had been mined by the retreating Germans, and Bulgarian sappers de-mined them.

Present-day views

Macedonian identity formed after World War II is deeply rooted in Yugoslav Partisan activity, and thus the Bulgarians are considered fascists. Macedonian media, such as Vo Centar, continue to spread the untruth that Skopje was liberated by Yugoslav communist guerrillas from the Bulgarian fascist occupiers. The 2016 Macedonian film, The Liberation of Skopje, portrays Bulgarian collaborators in a more negative light than the German Nazis. According to the Bulgarian Association for Research and Development of Civil Society, the film (which was sponsored by the Macedonian government) evokes anti-Bulgarian sentiment. A number of monuments have been erected in present-day North Macedonia honoring the communist guerrillas, but nothing preserves the memory of fallen Bulgarians. A total of 3,422 Bulgarian soldiers were killed and 2,136 were missing in the autumn of 1944 in present-day southern Serbia, North Macedonia and Kosovo.

In October 2019, the Bulgarian government proposed strict terms for North Macedonia's EU admission. One condition is for both countries to "harmonize" their World War II historical narratives, with North Macedonia tempering its view of Bulgaria. In a November 2020 interview with Bulgarian media, North Macedonian Prime Minister Zoran Zaev acknowledged the involvement of Bulgarian troops in the capture of Skopje and other towns during the war, and that the Bulgarians were not fascist occupiers. The interview was followed by a wave of nationalism in Skopje, with protests demanding Zaev's resignation; opposition leader Hristijan Mickoski accused him of threatening Macedonian national identity.

According to former Macedonian Prime Minister Ljubčo Georgievski, the reaction was the result of ignorance, hypocrisy or politics. Vlado Bučkovski, another former prime minister and chief negotiator with Bulgaria, stated a week later, amid the campaign against Zaev, that the Macedonians and Bulgarians were a single people, separated by the post-WWII Yugoslav policy. Journalist Dejan Azeski said in the weekly newspaper Fokus that Zaev's interview was politically unwise but factually accurate. According to Azeski, the Bulgarian military undoubtedly participated in the liberation of Macedonia (including Skopje) in the autumn of 1944. Bulgaria denies any occupation during the war and insists on double liberation (in 1941 and 1944), moreover fascism in Bulgaria was never a mass movement. The historical narrative in North Macedonia, however, insists on a victory of the local communist partisans over the Bulgarian fascist occupiers. The acknowledgement of Bulgarian influence on Macedonian history is highly problematic, because it clashes with the post-WWII Yugoslav Macedonian nation-building narrative, based on an anti-Bulgarian stance.

Gallery

See also 
World War II in Yugoslav Macedonia
Bulgaria during World War II

References

Battles and operations of World War II
Military operations of World War II involving Germany
Yugoslavia in World War II
Battles involving the Yugoslav Partisans
Military operations of World War II involving Bulgaria
1944 in Yugoslavia
Conflicts in 1944
October 1944 events
November 1944 events
20th century in Skopje